The Latinisation of names in the vernacular was a procedure deemed necessary for the sake of conformity by scribes and authors when incorporating references to such persons in Latin texts. The procedure was used in the era of the Roman Republic and Empire. It was used continuously by the Papacy from the earliest times, in religious tracts and in diplomatic and legal documents. It was used by the early European monasteries. Following the Norman Conquest of England, it was used by the Anglo-Norman clerics and scribes when drawing up charters. Its use was revived in the Renaissance when the new learning was written down in Latin and drew much on the work of Greek, Arabic and other non-Latin ancient authors. Contemporary Italian and European scholars also needed to be Latinised to be quoted in such treatises. The different eras produced their own styles and peculiarities. Sophistication was the trademark of the Renaissance Latinisers. The Anglo-Norman scribes on the other hand were not so learned, and often simply translated the vernacular name into Latin words based on similar sounds, without much effort to make sense or to avoid absurdity, which produced some strange results.

Coined in era of Imperial Rome
Iesus, Iesus Nazarenus, Iesus Christus (Yĕhošūa‘)
Elagabalus (Varius Avitus Bassianus, after god Elagabal)

Coined in the Early Middle Ages
Alphonsus (various rulers named Alfonso)
Augustinus Cantuariensis (Augustine of Canterbury)
Brocardus (Burchard)
Clovis (Clodovech, Frankish King)
Carolus Magnus (Karl)
Mahomet or Mahometus (Muhammad)
Moses Maimonides (Moshe ben Maimon)
Odoacer (Audawakrs)
 Caecilius (Aksel)

Coined in the High Middle Ages
Anselmus Cantuariensis (Anselmo d'Aosta)
Guido Aretinus (Guido d'Arezzo)

Coined in the Late Middle Ages
Thomas Aquinas (Tommaso d'Aquino)
 Duns Scotus (John Duns)

Coined in the Renaissance and onwards

Humanist names with Latin and Greek elements 
In central European circles of academia and ecclesial writers, a specific practice of Latinisation arose during the 15th century with the rediscovery of ancient literature. Thereby writers would seek connection to the ancient writers by taking up surnames or international pen names. We encounter names that follow naming conventions of those ancient languages, especially Latin and Greek, so the occasional Greek names for the same function are also included here.

Especially in the German-speaking regions the use of a “Humanistenname” or “Gelehrtenname” was common for many an academic, cleric, and secular administrative who wished to ascend in societal rank. The other region where the practice became equally common was 1600s Scandinavia and the Swedish Baltic colonies where this practice was called
'lärda namn' or 'humanistnamn'. Further reasons for assuming such internationally recognisable names, especially in Scandinavia, included leaving agrarian conditions behind and embracing an urban and cosmopolitan way of life.
Some academics never had a surname nor a patronymic surname as per their region of origin. However, academics came to Central European universities from all corners of Europe, with surnames from rare languages, so clarity in distinguishing students was necessary. Some Latinizations and Grecizations are exact vernacular translations of profession surnames or dwelling names, but others seem to bear no known connection or resemblance. Humanist names reached varying degrees of stability and heritability, and some exist to this day.

Some humanist names derived from common professions as replacements of the vernacular term, and were found throughout Central European university cities. They included:

Some humanist surnames that were not clearly based on profession or location included:

Other sources of English Latinized names
The Complete Peerage (1913) states concerning the Latinization of English names: "When a clerk had to render a name in a charter he usually sought for the nearest Latin equivalent, sometimes took a correct one, as "de Bello Campo" for "Beauchamp"; sometimes a grotesque one". The latter refers to the mediaeval Anglo-Norman family of Orescuilz, which held amongst others the Somersetshire manor of Sandford Orcas (named after it), whose surname was Latinised as de Aureis Testiculis, from French "Couilles d'Or".

Andrew Wright
A list of "Latin forms of English surnames" is included as an appendix in Andrew Wright's Court Hand Restored, or the Student's Assistant in reading Old Deeds, Charters, Records, etc, published in 9 editions up to 1879.

Charles Trice Martin
In 1910 Charles Trice Martin expanded on Wright's list (the 9th edition of which he had edited) in his The Record Interpreter: a collection of abbreviations, Latin words and names used in English historical manuscripts and records which included a chapter "Latin forms of English Surnames". He acknowledged in compiling his list the assistance of an anonymous work The Norman People and their Existing Descendants (London, 1874). In the preface, p. xi, Martin stated of that chapter: "Many of the [place names and] surnames have been found in classes of records which contain documents in both languages referring to the same case, like the Chancery Proceedings, in which bills and answers are in English and writs in Latin."

Martin stated that some of the Latin names were "due to the ingenuity" of officials and clerks inserting what they thought would be a translation of an English name, being ignorant of its real meaning and history. This led to spurious translations such as Ventus Morbidus (literally "sick wind") for the place name 'Windsor', and de Umbrosa Quercu (literally "from the shady oak") for the surname 'Dimock'. He went on to say that the list includes many names collected from Latin inscriptions on brasses, tombstones, and other monuments, many of them dating to the sixteenth century and later, and said that he had supplied the English equivalents of these from other sources of information.

Biological taxonomy

One of the most abundant sources of latinized names is in biological taxonomic nomenclature, particularly binomial nomenclature. Many thousands of species are named after individuals, chiefly but not exclusively scientists. This most often involves, in principle, creating a latinized equivalent of the name in question. In some cases this will involve a traditional latinization; for example, the grey penduline tit, Anthoscopus caroli, derives its specific name from the genitive of the traditional Latin form Carolus for the first name of the Swedish explorer Karl Johan Andersson. In most cases, the names are "one-off" latinized forms produced by adding the genitive endings -ii or -i for a man, -ae for a woman, or -orum in plural, to a family name, thereby creating a latinized form. For example, a name such as Macrochelys temminckii notionally represents a latinization of the family name of Coenraad Jacob Temminck to "Temminckius." Another example, Acisoma attenboroughi, latinizes the name of Sir David Attenborough as if "Attenboroughus."

See also 
 List of Latin nicknames of the Middle Ages

References

Lists of names

Latin given names
Latin-language surnames
Romanization